Paul H. Raihle (May 13, 1892 in Melrose, Minnesota – June 6, 1963) was a member of the Wisconsin State Assembly. He served in the military during World War I and attended the University of Paris. His wife, Sylvia Havre Raihle, would also be a member of the Assembly. They had five children.

Political career
Raihle was elected to the Assembly in 1924. He was a Republican.

References

People from Wright County, Minnesota
Republican Party members of the Wisconsin State Assembly
Military personnel from Wisconsin
American military personnel of World War I
University of Paris alumni
1892 births
1963 deaths
20th-century American politicians